OneConnect Financial Technology Co., Ltd. (OneConnect; ; pinyin: Jinróng yīzhàngtōng) is a technology-as-a-service platform for financial institutions. The Company was listed on the New York Stock Exchange in 2019.  OneConnect is an associate of Ping An Group.

As of June 30, 2020, OneConnect had served all of China’s major banks, 99% of its city commercial banks, and 53% of its insurance companies. In the same year it has been added to the FTSE Global Equity Index Series.

In September 2018, the ALFA intelligent ABS platform was launched.

References

Notes

Companies based in Shenzhen
Companies listed on the New York Stock Exchange
2015 establishments in China
Ping An Insurance